Shefki is a given name that may refer to:
 Shefki Hysa, an Albanian writer.
 Shefki Kuqi, a Finnish footballer.

Masculine given names